Talwara is a census town in Reasi district in the Indian union territory of Jammu and Kashmir.

Demographics
 India census, Talwara had a population of 5105. Males constitute 63% of the population and females 37%. Talwara has an average literacy rate of 68%, higher than the national average of 59.5%: male literacy is 78%, and female literacy is 52%. In Talwara, 11% of the population is under 6 years of age.

References

Cities and towns in Reasi district